This page lists the winners and nominees for the Soul Train Music Award for Best New Artist. The award has been given out every year since the first annual Soul Train Music Awards in 1987.

Winners and nominees
Winners are listed first and highlighted in bold.

1980s

1990s

2000s

2010s

2020s

References

Soul Train Music Awards
Music awards for breakthrough artist